Nicholas "Nicky" John Gooch (born 30 January 1973) is a British short track speed skater who competed in the 1992 Winter Olympics, 1994 Winter Olympics, 1998 Winter Olympics and 2002 Winter Olympics.

Gooch was born in Roehampton, south-west London, United Kingdom.  In 1992 he was a member of the British relay team which finished sixth in the 5000 metre relay competition.

Olympic Games

Two years later he won the bronze medal in the 500 metres contest and finished seventh in the 1000 metres competition at the Lillehammer Olympics.

At the 1998 Games he finished seventh with the British team in the 5000 metre relay event. In the 1000 metres contest he finished 22nd and in the 500 metres competition he finished 29th.

His final Olympic appearance was in 2002 when he finished 17th in the 1500 metres event and 27th in the 1000 metres contest.

Coaching

Gooch coaches the Great Britain short track speed skating team. He coaches Elise Christie, Jack Whelbourne, Jon Eley and Charlotte Gilmartin.

External links
 profile
 Nicky Gooch at the ISU
Nicky Gooch at the-sports.org

1973 births
Living people
British male short track speed skaters
Olympic short track speed skaters of Great Britain
Short track speed skaters at the 1992 Winter Olympics
Short track speed skaters at the 1994 Winter Olympics
Short track speed skaters at the 1998 Winter Olympics
Short track speed skaters at the 2002 Winter Olympics
Olympic bronze medallists for Great Britain
Olympic medalists in short track speed skating
Medalists at the 1994 Winter Olympics